"Maria Ninguém" ("Maria Nobody") is a song written by Carlos Lyra and first released by Brazilian bossa nova singer João Gilberto on his album Chega de Saudade in April 1959. It has been covered by numerous artists, most notably by Cliff Richard, who sang a Spanish-language version titled "Maria No Mas".

Cliff Richard version

Originally written and recorded in Portuguese, it was rewritten in Spanish for Cliff Richard and the Shadows' album When in Spain.

Release
"Maria No Mas" was released as a single in Belgium and the Netherlands in November 1963 with the B-side, "Tus Besos", written by Lionel Newman. In Germany, it was released in March 1964 with the B-side being a cover of "Spanish Harlem", written by Jerry Leiber and Phil Spector. Both B-sides of these two releases were solely credited to Cliff Richard, with backing by the Norrie Paramor Orchestra. In Spain, an EP, titled Un Saludo de Cliff, was released in 1963, with four tracks from When in Spain.

Track listing
7": Columbia / CH 3035 (Belgium & Netherlands)
 "Maria No Mas" – 2:07
 "Tus Besos" – 2:50

7": Columbia / C 22 667 (Germany)
 "Maria No Mas" – 2:07
 "Spanish Harlem" – 2:58

EP: Odeon / 7EPL 13.955 (Spain)
 "Maria No Mas" – 2:07
 "Quizas, Quizas, Quizas" – 2:31
 "La Cancion de Orfeo" – 3:53
 "Me Lo Dijo Adela" – 2:04

Personnel
 Cliff Richard – vocals
 Hank Marvin – lead guitar
 Bruce Welch – rhythm guitar, backing vocals
 Brian Locking – bass guitar
 Brian Bennett – drums

Charts

Other versions 
 In 1959, Carlos Lyra released his own version on his version on his debut album Bossa Nova.
 In 1964, French singer Brigitte Bardot covered the song on her album B.B..

References

1959 songs
Portuguese songs
Bossa nova songs